The Roberge Lake is located in the unorganized territory of Lac-Masketsi, Quebec, the Mekinac Regional County Municipality, in Mauricie, in Quebec, in Canada. This lake whose surface is usually frozen from November to April is located entirely in forest land.

Geography 
The length of the lake Roberge (Lac-Masketsi) is 2.25 km (north-south axis) and its maximum width is 1.25 km. A strip of land (in the north-south axis) whose width varies between 0.7 km and 1.6 km, with mountains, separates the lake and Roberge Lake Masketsi which is located west of the first.

Within 1.3 km north of Lake Roberge, four small lakes including Lake Faber and lake Narcisse are draining into Lake Roberge. North of these lakes, we encounter the dividing line between the water catchment areas of the Saint-Maurice River and Batiscan River.

The Tawachiche Road West runs along the west shore of Lake Roberge.

Toponymy 

The name "Lake Roberge" was officially registered on December 5, 1968 in the Bank of place names of the Commission de toponymie du Québec (Geographical Names Board of Québec)

See also

References

External links 
 Municipality of the Parish of Lac-aux-Sables 
 Official site of the municipality of Trois-Rives 
 Mekinac Regional County Municipality:  

Lakes of Mauricie
Mékinac Regional County Municipality